Utricularia pulchra is a small, probably annual, carnivorous plant that belongs to the genus Utricularia. It is endemic to New Guinea. It was originally described by Peter Taylor in 1977.

See also 
 List of Utricularia species

References 

Flora of New Guinea
Carnivorous plants of Asia
Plants described in 1977
pulchra
Endemic flora of New Guinea